Vivencias (English Experiences) is the twelfth studio album by Mexican pop singer, Ana Gabriel. It was released on 1996. This material was produced by herself.

Track listing
Tracks:
 No Te Hago Falta 05:00
 Es Tarde Ya 04:12
 Sólo Fantasía (Como Imaginar) 05:19
 Yo No Te Dije Adiós 03:55
 Fue en Un Café (Under the Boardwalk) 03:34
 No Sabes 03:52
 Miedo 03:30
 Esta Noche 03:26
 Tú No Te Imaginas 03:44
 Que Haré Sin Ti 03:19
 Under the Boardwalk 03:34

Album Charts

 Note: This release reached the #14 position in Billboard Latin Pop Albums staying for 5 weeks  and it reached the #28 position in the Billboard Top Latin Albums staying for 15 weeks in the chart.

Singles
 No Te Hago Falta reached #12  on Hot Latin Songs.

References

1996 albums
Ana Gabriel albums